Gerry McInerney (born 1961 in Sixmilebridge, County Clare) is an Irish sportsperson.  He plays hurling with his local club Sixmilebridge and was a member of the Clare senior inter-county team from 1980 until 1991.

References

 

1961 births
Living people
Sixmilebridge hurlers
Clare inter-county hurlers
Munster inter-provincial hurlers